Glenwood or the Glenwood–Brooklyn Historic District is a historic neighborhood and national historic district located at Raleigh, North Carolina. The district encompasses 286 contributing buildings in an early-20th century streetcar suburb for working- and middle-class whites.  Glenwood and Brooklyn were developed between about 1905 to 1951 and includes notable examples of Colonial Revival, Queen Anne, and Bungalow / American Craftsman style architecture. The houses are predominantly 1 1/2- and 2-story frame dwellings.

It was listed on the National Register of Historic Places in 1985 as Glenwood, with a boundary increase / decrease in 2002 to include the Brooklyn neighborhood.

Since the 1980s, some large homes have become apartments, and other homes have been torn down, with new ones going up.

On April 5, 2016, Raleigh City Council voted for the city's first streetside historic overlay district. Area residents had asked for the rezoning since 2014, hoping to prevent too much new development. In many cases, improvements, demolition, and new buildings will now require a detailed review.

See also
 List of Registered Historic Places in North Carolina

References

External links
 Historic Glenwood–Brooklyn Neighborhood Association
 National Register Historic Districts in Raleigh, North Carolina, RHDC
 Glenwood–Brooklyn Historic District, RHDC

Houses on the National Register of Historic Places in North Carolina
Historic districts on the National Register of Historic Places in North Carolina
Colonial Revival architecture in North Carolina
Queen Anne architecture in North Carolina
Neighborhoods in Raleigh, North Carolina
National Register of Historic Places in Raleigh, North Carolina
Houses in Raleigh, North Carolina